Gameface is the debut studio album by Filipino pop/R&B singer Jay R, released in the Philippines in August 2003 by Universal Records. He produced the album together with Ray Brown and Troy Johnson, in partnership with NuLife and his record label. To date, the album has reached Platinum status by the Philippine Association of the Record Industry (PARI), denoting over 30,000 units sold in the country.

The album was made available on digital download through iTunes and Amazon.com on January 23, 2007.

Background
At the age of sixteen, Jay R was already a member of a group called FI (First Impression). The group consisted of five members, including Jimmy Martinez (who came to Manila with Jay R and is now popularly known as Jimmy Muna). When the other members left the group, he and Muna replaced them with Kris Cadevida (later known as Kris Lawrence after winning ABS-CBN singing show Search for the Star in a Million). They did gigs in Los Angeles, San Francisco, and Michigan. He, also, became the lead singer with his sister Jhing of another band that was led by his late uncle, Robert Sillona, called The Howlers. Later, his sister Jhing would collaborate with him in creating songs. He started performing gigs all around Southern California. He also did back-up vocals for major artists, whose albums were released in the United States, Latin America, Philippines and other territories. Later, he started co-writing songs with these international artists. He has collaborated with Ray Brown, Troy Johnson, Jason Edmonds, 3am, Steve Singer, Gary Brown, Triangle Productions, Dutch Cousin, Chuck Cymone and many other talented producers, even before he got the record deal with Universal.

Singles
 Gameface was released in August 2003, accompanied by Jay R's debut single, "Design for Luv". The song contains an R&B, hip hop vibe, which was rare for OPM songs at that time. It received heavy airplay, but did not perform well enough to be a breakthrough hit. The song's music video was shot on Hollywood, Los Angeles, California. It is almost plotless and just shows scenes of Jay R singing to the song, while sexy girls are dancing around him. JD Jr. is featured on the song's video.
 Following the first single, he released a Tagalog ballad penned by Vehnee Saturno, entitled "Bakit Pa Ba". It became the biggest hit from the album. The music video is dark and has a sad feel. It depicts Jay R singing to the song for his love interest. Immediately after the success of the single, the album was certified Gold by the PARI.
 In 2004, the album was re-released, containing two new tracks, "Kung Mahal Mo Siya" and "Throw Your Hands in the Air" (Remix)—both of which were used as singles. "Kung Mahal Mo Siya" was also written by Saturno, and was the third single from the album. It is an OPM ballad that has a similar composition to "Bakit Pa Ba", although it didn't have the same impact as "Bakit Pa Ba" did.
 "Throw Your Hands in the Air", the original version, was released as the album's fourth and final single. The song slightly differs from the remix version (which was included on the repackaged album), and also features Krook and JOLO.

Promotion
As a debut artist, Jay R did several concerts and performances to promote his album. In April 2004, he accomplished his first ever three-night solo major concert which was entitled Gameface the Concert at the Music Museum. The concert showcased his vocal rhythm and harmony, performing with Mystreme band, and singing the most wanted hits of different genres. It was staged by popular concert director Louie Ignacio and Mon Faustino. The first concert was so successful, it was immediately followed by another one, entitled Gameface Reload, held at the Folk Arts Theater on September 25, 2004. The second concert featured special guests with big names in the industry, including Regine Velasquez, Ai Ai de las Alas, Kyla and Sandara Park.

Reception
Gameface has proven Jay R as a breakthrough artist. It received positive reviews, both from music critics and listeners. It also performed well commercially, certifying Platinum by the PARI to date. Furthermore, it is one of the albums from the early 2000s that have brought back heavy R&B-hip hop to the OPM music scene. It has influenced current Filipino male R&B acts like Kris Lawrence and Duncan Ramos. In addition, he was compared to Gary Valenciano, described in terms of his vocal performance on the album. On September 9, 2004, the 17th Awit Awards was held, wherein he was nominated for three categories (Best Ballad, Song of the Year and Music Video of the Year). He won Best Ballad song, but lost the Song of the Year and Music Video of the Year awards to Parokya ni Edgar's "Mr. Suave". On the same year, he received two nominations on the MTV Pilipinas Music Awards (Favorite Male and Favorite New Artist) —where he won Favorite Male, but lost the other award to Bamboo. He was also named as the Most Promising Male Performer of the year 2004 by Aliw Awards.

Awards and nominations
 Awit Award for Best Ballad ("Bakit Pa Ba") - won
 Awit Award for Song of the Year ("Bakit Pa Ba") - awarded to "Mr. Suave" by Parokya ni Edgar
 Awit Award for Music Video of the Year ("Bakit Pa Ba") - awarded to "Mr. Suave" by Parokya ni Edgar
 Aliw Award for Most Promising Male Performer - won
 MTV Pilipinas for Favorite Male Video ("Bakit Pa Ba") - won
 MTV Pilipinas for Favorite New Artist in a Video ("Bakit Pa Ba") - awarded to Bamboo
 Philippine Hip-Hop Award for Male R&B Artist of the Year - awarded to Luke Mejares
 Philippine Hip-Hop Award for R&B Video of the Year ("Bakit Pa Ba") - awarded to "The Show" by South Border

Track listing
 "Design for Luv" (rap part by JD) (Jay R Sillona, Troy Johnson, Allen Sovory, Michael Nielsen, Ralph Churchwell IV) – 3:43
 "Where Do We Go" (Sillona, Johnson, Sovory, Nielsen, Churchwell, A. Bacani, M. Gabriel, O. Maurao, Jimmy Martinez) – 3:39
 "All I Need" (Shawn Dark, RedOne) – 3:43
 "I Got a Girl" (Ian Boxill, Jean Bellefeuille, A. Merrit) – 3:41
 "Farewell" (Johnson, K. Ratliff) – 3:41
 "Rivers Running" (Johnson, S. Young) – 3:43
 "Gameface" (rap part by Beeno) (Johnson, Young, A. Tanner) – 3:41
 "Tongue Ring" (Johnson, A. Cantrell, D. Sharp) – 3:01
 "My Bestfriend's Girl" (Sillona, Johnson, Martinez) – 3:54
 "Our Love" (Sovory, Nielsen, Churchwell) – 5:07
 "Kaibigan" (Jhing Sillona, Johnson) – 5:01
 "Bakit Pa Ba" (Vehnee Saturno) – 4:45

Repackaged bonus tracks
Gameface was re-issued in 2004 with two new tracks that were used as the album's final commercial singles.

 "Throw Your Hands in the Air" (Remix) (featuring Krook & JOLO) (Krook & JOLO, DJ M.O.D.) – 3:41
 "Kung Mahal Mo Siya" (Saturno) – 4:13

Personnel
 Jean Bellefeuille – producer
 Rico Bicol – digital mastering
 Elmer Blancaflor – arranger
 Ian Boxill – producer
 Ray Brown – executive producer
 Shawn Dark – producer
 DJ M.O.D. – producer, arranger
 Bryson Evans – producer
 Dominique James – photography
 Troy Johnson – executive producer, producer, mixing and mastering
 Jimmy Martinez – producer
 RedOne – producer
 Efren San Pedro – mixing engineer
 Vehnee Saturno – producer, mastering engineer
 Jay R Sillona – lead vocals, back-up vocals, producer
 Bon Sundiang – art direction, cover design
 Bella Dy Tan – executive producer
 The Triangle – producer

Recording locations
 Saturno Music Production (Quezon City, Philippines) – recording (tracks 12, 14)
 Natures Finest Soundlab – mixing and mastering

Certifications

Release history

References

2003 debut albums
2004 albums
Jay R Sillona albums